The 2020–21 Greek Basket League, also known as the 2020–21 betshop.gr Greek Basket League for sponsorship reasons, is the 81st season of the Greek Basket League, the top-tier level professional club basketball league in Greece. The season begun on 24 October 2020.

Teams

Promotion and relegation
Relegated from the Greek Basket League 2019–20 season
Ifaistos Lemnos, Rethymno Cretan Kings and Panionios decided not to participate in the Greek Basket League in the 2020–21 season, due to financial problems.

Promoted from the Greek A2 Basket League 2019–20 season
Messolonghi won the A2 League championship, and was thus promoted to the first tier level, for the first time in its history.

Locations and arenas

Regular season

League table

Results

Playoffs
The eight highest ranked teams in the regular season qualified for the playoffs. Quarterfinals will be played in a Best of 3 format while the rest of the series will be played in a Best of 5 format.

Bracket

Quarterfinals

|}

Semifinals

|}

Third place series

|}

Finals

|}

Final standings

Clubs in European-wide competitions

See also
2020–21 Greek Basketball Super Cup
2020–21 Greek Basketball Cup
2020–21 Greek A2 Basket League (2nd tier)

References

External links 
 Official Basket League Site 
 Official Basket League Site 
 Official Hellenic Basketball Federation Site 

Greek Basket League seasons
1
Greek